Midlothian and Peebles was a short-lived county constituency represented in the House of Commons of the Parliament of the United Kingdom from 1950 until 1955. It was formed by a merger of parts of the old Midlothian and Peebles Northern and Peebles and Southern constituencies. It was reunited in 1955 to form Midlothian.

Boundaries
For its short existence, Midlothian and Peebles covered the counties of Midlothian and Peebles inclusive of all the burghs situated therein except the county of the city of Edinburgh and the burgh of Musselburgh.

Members of Parliament

Election results

References 

Historic parliamentary constituencies in Scotland (Westminster)
Constituencies of the Parliament of the United Kingdom established in 1950
Constituencies of the Parliament of the United Kingdom disestablished in 1955